Ormiston Shelfield Community Academy is a secondary school with academy status located in the Metropolitan Borough of Walsall, West Midlands, England. The school is sponsored by Ormiston Academies Trust under the current leadership of Mr. S Turnbull.

On 6 September , the previously existing Shelfield Sports and Community College was replaced by a new entity entitled Shelfield Community Academy.  This was mostly a legality involving the governance of the institution, and did not disrupt the educational programmes at the school.

Ormiston Shelfield Community Academy serves approximately 1320 students attending the school, including 420 sixth formers. The school is renowned for significantly improving its exam results within the last five years. 
In 2009, it was announced that many parts of the school would be rebuilt in a new state-of-the-art facility. Kier Education were appointed to build the new school. The first phase of the rebuilding project opened on 7 September 2011 to Year 7 students, incorporating English, Maths, Science, PE and Humanities into the new building.

In September 2012, the second phase of the rebuilding project was partially completed in time for the start of the new academic year. New facilities were provided along with IT rooms; a new library, sixth form area, administration and catering facilities. The theatre, which had remained inactive since September 2011 due to refurbishment also re-opened at this time. Other areas, including Business Studies, Technology and the Sixth Form centre was transformed in October 2012 when the old buildings were demolished and an external regeneration product was finished in July 2013.

References

External links
 http://www.scacademy.co.uk - Home page

Academies in Walsall
Secondary schools in Walsall
Ormiston Academies